The Hong Kong Academy of Engineering Sciences (HKAES) is an engineering science institution based in Hong Kong. It aims on encouraging and maintaining distinction in the field of engineering with useful resolution, and to promote the development of the science, art and practice of engineering for the social well-being.

History
The Academy was established on 13 September 1994, by Sir S.Y. Chung, Prof. Yau-Kai Cheung, Sir Charles K. Kao and other engineering scholars in Hong Kong.

References

External links
  HKAES Website

Professional associations based in Hong Kong
National academies of engineering
Learned societies of Hong Kong
1994 establishments in Hong Kong